Vicianin is a cyanogenic disaccharide.

The enzyme vicianin beta-glucosidase uses (R)-vicianin and H2O to produce mandelonitrile and vicianose. It is found in seeds of Vicia angustifolia.

References 

Cyanogenic glycosides